The artist known as Jordan Målare (literally, "Jordan the painter") was a Swedish artist, leader of a workshop that  1460 to 1470 manufactured altarpieces for several Swedish churches. In 1484 he became a burgher of Arboga. Altarpieces from his workshop exist in the churches of Sollentuna, Sånga, Ekerö, Romfartuna and Bollnäs, as well as on display in the Swedish History Museum in Stockholm.

References

Swedish artists
Gothic artists